The Ismail Qemali University of Vlorë is a public university located in Vlorë, Albania. It was founded in 1994 as Vlorë University of Technology Ismail Qemali. As of 2014, it offers degrees in economics, public health, and humanities, in addition to engineering and technology.

See also 
 List of universities in Albania
 Quality Assurance Agency of Higher Education
 List of colleges and universities
 List of colleges and universities by country

Universities in Albania
Educational institutions established in 1994
Buildings and structures in Vlorë
1994 establishments in Albania
Education in Vlorë